Gregory W. Baise (born April 13, 1952) is an American politician. He previously served as the longtime President and CEO of the Illinois Manufacturers' Association. Before that, Baise served in many political and governmental roles, including as Illinois Secretary of Transportation, in which role he was director of the Illinois Department of Transportation.

Baise has been involved in a number of political action committees (PACs).

Early life and education
Baise was born April 13, 1952 in Jacksonville, Illinois. He grew up on a farm nearby. He graduated from Triopia High School in 1970, and went on to attend Illinois College in Jacksonville. He graduated from Illinois College in 1974.

Career
Baise spent his final two summers of college as an intern at the United States House of Representatives at the time of the Watergate hearings.

After graduating from college, Baise was elected an alderman in Jacksonville. He served as alderman from 1975 through 1978. His employment outside of government was in the admission's department of Illinois College.

During the 1976 Illinois gubernatorial election, Baise volunteered for the campaign of James R. Thompson. This began a fourteen year period in which he would hold various roles as a staffer for Thompson. After Thompson's victory, Baise was hired to serve as a travel aide to Governor Thompson. In 1979, he became Thompson's scheduler, heading the governor's scheduling office. Effective January 5, 1981, he became Thompson's Personnel Director, a role in which he oversaw the governor's patronage appointments. At the same time that he became the Personnel Director, he also was named an assistant to Arthur Quern, the Director of Government Operations.

Baise was campaign manager for Thompson's 1986 reelection campaign.

During the 1984 United States presidential election, Baise managed Ronald Reagan's campaign operations in Illinois.

Illinois Secretary of Transportation
In November 1984, Baise was appointed by Thompson as Illinois Secretary of Transportation, making him the director of the Illinois Department of Transportation (IDOT).

Under Baise, an emergency number *999 was created as the Cellular Express Line to be used by expressway motorists with mobile phones (then on the rise) in the Chicago-area. Baise announced the program in August 1989.

In November 1989, Baise told local officials that IDOT had decided that it would only complete a portion of the planned route of Illinois Route 390.

During Baise's tenure, work was completed on upgrading U.S. Route 51 in Illinois.

During the 1988 United States presidential election, Baise served as an advisor to George H. W. Bush's campaign operations in Illinois, and ran its Southern Illinois operations.

In 1989, Baise also appointed as chairman of the Governor's Earthquake Preparedness Task Force.

Plans for a new airport

Baise was involved in  the Chicago Airport Capacity Study in partnership with the state's of Wisconsin and Indiana. The study concluded that a new airport would need to be constructed by the year 2000, and should be located in the southern part of the region. The study and its conclusions drew criticism for its cost projections and passenger projections, among other critiques. The technical committee of the study, which consisted of the planning departments of the three states, had departed the study with its own conclusions, that argued that the region's existing airports could sufficiently meet demand in the foreseeable future. However, the policy committee of the study, led by Baise along with Aldo DeAngelis and Lieutenant Governor of Illinois George Ryan, continued ahead with studying plans for an additional airport. After Wisconsin got its demand of having Milwaukee Mitchell International Airport named as Chicago's "supplemental" airport, the state withdrew from its participation in the study, leaving just Illinois and Indiana.

In 1989, the Illinois-Indiana Regional Airport Study was formed, and its commission studied four potential sites, including Gary Airport, a site along the Illinois-Indiana border, Peotone, Illinois, and Kankakee, Illinois. They also, at the urging of newly-elected Chicago mayor Richard M. Daley, added the proposed Lake Calumet airport to their study.

Baise became chairman of the Third Airport Policy Committee.

1990 Illinois Treasurer campaign
November 16, 1989 Baise resigned as Secretary of Transportation in order to focus on his campaign running for Illinois Treasurer in 1990.

Baise won the Republican nomination, but lost general election to Democrat Pat Quinn

Baise campaigned on a message of conservatism. His opponent, Quinn, campaigned as a populist reformer in opposition to big government.

Baise's campaign adopted a tactic of painting Quinn as a longtime anti-establishment demagogue. His campaign also criticized Quinn for his failed 1986 treasurer campaign and for having considered runs for various other offices before opting to run again for treasurer. His campaign also painted Quinn as having had few accomplishments.

Baise criticized Quinn's plan to close what Quinn had called a "tax loophole". Quinn had lobbied for the state to impose a sales tax on farm machinery.

One of Baise's campaign proposals was to establish a "College Savings Plan" to enable the treasurer's office to help students and families afford the cost of higher education. He also promised to modernize the office through technology. This included establishing electronic transfers of funds. He additionally promised to expand the Illinois Public Treasurers’ Investment Pool through collaboration with municipal governments and local treasurers. He also pledged that he would request the Illinois General Assembly establish an advisory board to give him recommendations on where he should invest state money.

During his campaign, there was an incident in which his two-engine plane lost power and landed in a wheat field near Pontiac, Illinois. There were no injuries.

Quinn accused Baise of improper conduct by accepting a loan from a road contractor while serving as Illinois Secretary of Transportation.

Baise ultimately lost to Quinn by an 11.4 point margin. Of all the major-party nominees for Illinois statewide offices in 1990, Baise received the least votes, the greatest margin of defeat, and the lowest percentage of the vote in his race.

Leadership of the Illinois Manufacturer's Association
On March 1, 1991, Baise succeeded Arthur R. Gottschalk as President of the Illinois Manufacturers' Association (IMA). He later also became CEO.

As head of the organization, Baise quickly involved himself in lobbying business issues, including regulatory reforms such as the deregulation of electrical utilities and efforts to alter workers' compensation laws.

Baise was credited with overseeing a revitalization of the IMA's education foundation.

IMA was involved with successfully pushing for the repeal of the Illinois Structural Work Act, the institution of the Manufacturer's Purchase Credit, the passage of significant reforms to workers' compensation and unemployment insurance, major reforms to tort law and education policies, and the passage of landmark hydraulic fracturing legislation.

In 2004, Baise founded Xpress Professional Services, a for-profit subsidiary of IMA. Xpress Professional Services is a political fulfillment firm which delivers such services as direct mail, radio, and television production and placement for candidates. The firm would also, in 2006, establish a polling service named We Ask America.

In 2018, Baise announced that he would retire as President and CEO of the Illinois Manufacturers' Association effective January 1, 2019. He also announced that he would continue to head the organizations' subsidiary for-profit political strategy and marketing firm Xpress Professional Services.

Political action committee involvement
Baise has been involved with a number of political action committees (PACs).

The Illinois Manufacturers' Association, which Baise was the longtime head of, has its own political action committee called Manufacturers PAC, also known as MPAC.

In 2004, Baise, became the lead co-founder of the Illinois Coalition for Jobs, a 501(c) organization.

In 2008, Baise and Ronald Gidwitz formed the Economic Freedom Alliance, a 527 organization, to oppose the passage of the Employee Free Choice Act.
 
Baise has served as treasurer of New Prosperity Foundation political action committee since it was founded during the 2010 election cycle.

Baise serves as chairman of Ideas Illinois PAC.

In 2019, Baise founded the Vote No on Blank Check Amendment Committee to oppose the Illinois Fair Tax. He served as head of the committee.

Personal life
Baise and his wife, Tonya, have two children.

At various points of his life Baise has lived in various places in Illinois, including Chicago, Jacksonville, Lemont, Oak Brook, Springfield, and Willowbrook.

Electoral history

Jacksonville Alderman

Illinois State Treasurer

References

1952 births
Living people
Illinois Republicans
Politicians from Jacksonville, Illinois
Illinois College alumni
Businesspeople from Illinois
Illinois city council members
State cabinet secretaries of Illinois